= SMK Kok Lanas =

Sekolah Menengah Kebangsaan Kok Lanas (Kok Lanas government secondary school) is a coeducational day school located in Kampung Kok Lanas, Kota Bharu, Kelantan, Malaysia.

Enrolment levels have increased over recent years from 1158 students in 2007 to 1260 in 2010 (644 boys and 616 girls). There are 78 teachers, giving a staff-student ratio of 16.
